Latium (pronounced "Latcham" or "Lotzyum"), is an unincorporated community in Washington County, Texas, United States.  It is one of five Latin Settlements founded by German Texan political refugees in Texas after 1848. The community's primary place of worship is Sacred Heart Catholic Church, a Roman Catholic church built in 1918 to serve the area's Catholic Czech community.

References 

Unincorporated communities in Washington County, Texas
German-American culture in Texas
Latin Settlement
Unincorporated communities in Texas